RAW is a brand of rolling papers created in 1995 by Josh Kesselman. Rolling papers are designed to be used for smoking tobacco and cannabis. RAW filters and hand-rolling machines are also products from the same brand.

History

1993 - 2004 
While in college, Josh Kesselman researched opening a “very small” smoke shop as part of a project. At the time, he was also trading rolling papers with collectors in Europe. After receiving an 'A' on the project, he decided to open the store in real life.

In 1993, after graduating and selling all of his possessions, Josh Kesselman was able to start a smoke shop named Knuckleheads in Gainesville, Florida, which imported specialty rolling papers from Europe and sold smoking paraphernalia. In 1996, Kesselman accidentally sold a bong to a woman whose father worked for the US government. Kesselman was raided and placed under house arrest. Later that year, Kesselman moved to Arizona to start a smoke shop supply and distribution company called HBI.

By 1997, Kesselman met the owner of a rolling paper factory in Spain's Alcoy region, which had been producing rolling papers since 1764. Through the partnership Kesselman developed two brands, Juicy Jay's, which were flavored papers, and Elements, which were similar to rice papers.

2004 - present 
In 2004, Kesselman made a $1 million investment to a supplier of natural, unprocessed and unbleached hemp fiber, which could be marketed as "vegan" papers. The concept was successful and RAW became the first company to offer "vegan" papers. In 2005, RAW launched its first line of rolling papers. The paper was made from unbleached hemp and was free of chemicals, additives, and dyes. In 2023, the company clarified its Organic Hemp rolling papers are made in Benimarfull, a village in the Alicante Providence of Spain using unbleached certified organic hemp milled from mills in Southern France.

Manufacturing 
The papers are produced in a variety of styles and sizes. These papers are made from unbleached and unrefined plant fibers, which gives them a unique texture and a natural brown color.  RAW papers also use a water-based gum as a chemical-free bonding agent. The production process involves blending the fibers, creating a pulp, drying the paper, and inspecting it for quality. Something that sets RAW rolling papers apart from other brands is a unique watermark. The watermark is created by pressing the paper between two metal plates, which leaves a distinctive pattern on the paper. The watermark serves two purposes: it helps prevent the paper from burning too quickly, and it also helps to ensure that the paper burns evenly.

Activism 
RAW commits a portion of its total sales to environmental groups such as Water is Life International, Trees for the Future, Wine to Water, CarbonFund.org, Home ‘Fur’ Good, and Kiva.

Pop culture 
Rapper Wiz Khalifa dedicated a song to the brand, titled "Raw." The company’s product has also been supported by Curren$y, 2 Chainz, Mick Jenkins, Chris Webby, Z-Ro, and Futuristic. In 2014, RAW partnered with Wiz Khalifa and he released his own line of rolling papers. Mary Schumacher of The Fresh Toast recommended RAW rolling papers to people who smoke cannabis. In 2022, they were added to the list of best rolling papers by Esquire. In 2017, RAW Black rolling papers were included on the list of best rolling papers from High Times Magazine.

Controversy 
On February 9, 2023, HBI and rival brand Republic were involved in a court case. HBI had been accused of having misleading information regarding all papers being made in Alcoy Spain, the company's charitable organizations, and being the "only" provider of organic rolling papers.

See also
 Roll-your-own
 List of rolling papers

References

External links

Cigarette rolling papers